Gyldenløve, was a surname for several illegitimate children of Oldenburg kings of Denmark-Norway in the 17th century.

Kings
The surname Gyldenløve was given to the sons of the following Dano-Norwegian kings: 
 Christian IV of Denmark (1588–1648) 
 Frederick III (1648–1670)
 Christian V (1670–1699)

Christian IV
Christian IV had many illegitimate children by various mistresses. Three of his illegitimate sons were officially recognised and given the surname Gyldenløve: 
 Christian Ulrik (1611–1640) by Kirsten Madsdatter
 Hans Ulrik (1615–1645) by Karen Andersdatter
 Ulrik Christian (1630–1658) by Vibeke Kruse

Frederick III
Frederick III fathered Ulrik Frederick (1638–1704) by Margrethe Pape, who was also acknowledged and given the surname Gyldenløve. Ulrik Frederick earned great respect from Norwegians while serving as a Statholder in Norway.

Christian V
Christian V fathered five children with Sophie Amalie Moth:
 Christiane Gyldenløve (1672–1689)
 Christian Gyldenløve (1674–1703)
 Sophie Christiane Gyldenløve (1675–1684)
 Anna Christiane Gyldenløve (1676–1689)
 Ulrik Christian Gyldenløve (1678–1719), Count of Samsø. (Not to be confused with the son of Christian IV.)

See also
 Fitzroy

References

Danish monarchy
Norwegian monarchy